Revenge of the Barracuda is the fourth solo studio album by American rapper WC. It was released on March 8, 2011 via eOne. Production was handled by Hallway Productionz, Jahzilla, EQ, Fredwreck, Jiggolo, THX and Trick-Trick. It features guest appearances from Young Maylay, Bad Lucc, Daz Dillinger, Ice Cube, Juvenile, Kokane, Kurupt, Soopafly and Traci Nelson.

The album peaked at number forty on the Top R&B/Hip-Hop Albums, number twenty on the Top Rap Albums and number 48 on the Independent Albums in the United States.

Singles
The first single from the album is "That's What I'm Talking About", which is also included in an EP with the same name, released on July 27, 2010, the track was produced by the duo Hallway Productionz, and written by them and WC.

The second single is "You Know Me", which features Ice Cube and Young Maylay, was released on iTunes on February 1, 2011. This song has also produced by Hallway Productionz, and was written by the duo, WC, Cube and Maylay, alongside Jaret Griffin-Black.

Track listing

Personnel

William "WC" Calhoun, Jr. – main artist, songwriter
Traci Nelson – vocals & songwriter (track 1)
Teak "Tha Beatsmith" Underdue – producer & songwriter (tracks: 1-3, 6)
Deejon Underdue – producer & songwriter (tracks: 1-3, 6)
Fingaz McGee – vocal arrangement (track 1)
O'Shea "Ice Cube" Jackson – featured artist (track 2), songwriter (tracks: 2, 8)
Christopher "Young Maylay" Bellard – featured artist & songwriter (tracks: 2, 11)
Charles "Uncle Chucc" Hamilton – vocals & songwriter (track 2)
Jeret "J Black" Griffin-Black – songwriter (track 2)
Jerry "Kokane" Long – featured artist & songwriter (track 4)
Pernell "Jahzilla" Suber – producer (tracks: 4, 8), songwriter (track 4)
Edward "eQ" Ogbonna – producer & songwriter (track 5)
Flip Matrix – co-producer (track 5)
Delmar "Daz Dillinger" Arnaud – featured artist & songwriter (track 7)
Priest "Soopafly" Brooks – featured artist & songwriter (track 7)
Ricardo "Kurupt" Brown – featured artist (track 7)
David "Roscoe" Williams – songwriter (track 7)
Terence "Bad Lucc" Harden – featured artist (track 7), songwriter (tracks: 7, 8, 11)
Christopher "THX" Goodman – producer & songwriter (track 7)
Amir "Jiggolo" Perry – producer & songwriter (track 9)
Terius "Juvenile" Gray – featured artist (track 10)
Farid "Fredwreck" Nassar – producer (tracks: 10, 11), guitar, keyboards & songwriter (track 10)
Erik "Baby Jesus" Coomes – bass, guitar & songwriter (track 10)
Chris "Trick-Trick" Mathis – producer, songwriter & mixing (track 12)
David Lopez – mixing (tracks: 1-7, 9-11), recording (track 6), additional vocal recording (track 12)
Kenny McCloud – recording (track 7)
Lamar "Crazy Toones" Calhoun – scratches, additional arrangement
Pascal Kerouche – design
Bob Perry – A&R
Chris Herche – marketing
Shawnte Crespo – product manager
Marleny Dominguez – label manager
Courtney Lowery – publicity
Giovanna Melchiorre – publicity

Charts

References

External links

2011 albums
E1 Music albums
WC (rapper) albums
Albums produced by Fredwreck
Gangsta rap albums by American artists